Two World War I flying aces were born in Swaziland. They were:

 Leonard A. Payne
 Percy Frank Charles Howe

References

Swaziland
World War I flying aces
World War I flying aces